Edna Neillis (15 April 1953 – 13 July 2015) was a Scottish women's association football player, who represented the Scottish women's football team and played in the French and Italian championships.

Neillis was born in Glasgow, and raised in the east of the city, playing football in the streets as a child and for Ruchazie boys' team. She went on to play with Westthorn United, a women's team based in Glasgow. She earned her first cap with the Scotland national team as a teenager and played in the team's first international match against England in 1972. Previously, women's football was banned for over 50 years.

Neillis and her teammate Rose Reilly received a lifetime ban by the Scottish FA after speaking out against the national team's amateur-level coach in 1975. She continued to play professionally in Italy.

Honors and awards
 Serie A title: 1975 (with Milan)
 Italian Cup (3): 1975, 1976 (with Milan); 1980 (with Gorgonzola)
Inducted into Scottish Women in Sport Hall of Fame in 2018.

In popular culture
In 2013, Neillis was featured in the BBC documentary Honeyballers, focused on the pioneers of Scottish women's football. In December 2015, a motion to induct Neillis into the Scottish Football Hall of Fame
was proposed.

References

External links
 Edna Neillis Recognised at Art Exhibition

Scottish women's footballers
Scotland women's international footballers
2015 deaths
1953 births
Expatriate women's footballers in Italy
Serie A (women's football) players
Scottish expatriate women's footballers
Women's association football forwards
Stade de Reims Féminines players
Expatriate women's footballers in France
Scottish expatriate sportspeople in France
Scottish expatriate sportspeople in Italy
Footballers from Glasgow
ACF Milan players